Only Human is a BBC Books original novel written by Gareth Roberts and based on the long-running British science fiction television series Doctor Who. It was published on 8 September 2005, alongside The Deviant Strain and The Stealers of Dreams. It features the Ninth Doctor, Rose Tyler and Captain Jack.

Synopsis
The presence of a Neanderthal on present-day Earth alerts the Doctor, Rose and Jack to the fact that someone is meddling with time. In order to learn the truth, they must travel back 28,000 years, where they meet humans of the past and future — and something far, far worse.

Plot

At a fancy dress party in Bromley, a young Roman starts a fight with a caveman.

Meanwhile, on the TARDIS, the Doctor, Rose and Captain Jack Harkness are setting off to Kegron Pluva. Explaining that it is a "dirty rip engine" that is causing the disturbance, the Doctor pilots the TARDIS to Bromley in the early 21st century.

The TARDIS lands, and the Doctor and Jack attempt to trace the disturbance.  Rose goes across the street to a manicure shop and finds out that a fight at a nightclub resulted in a caveman being taken to hospital.

Upon arriving at the hospital, the trio soon realize that the army has closed it off. The Doctor and Rose go into the hospital.  Inside, a nurse explains that someone was brought in the night before with the Ebola virus.

After finding the room with the Neanderthal, the Doctor explains that he is Dr Table and that he is an expert in acromegaly. With the help of the patient's nurse Weronika, they get the Neanderthal out of the hospital and into the TARDIS.

The Neanderthal gives his name as Das, and the Doctor asks him how he came to be in this time period.  From his explanation, they realize the dirty rip engine is from time travelers visiting in 29,185 BC. As the TARDIS leaves, Das starts to dissolve in a green pool of light.  The TARDIS shudders and shrieks, but manages to reverse, and the Doctor says the original time trip has polluted Das's cell structure, and he cannot go home.

The Doctor and Rose go back in time to figure out what's going on.  He's rented an apartment for them, gives Jack a psychic credit card, and says they'll be back in a month.

The TARDIS lands on a plain, with forest nearby.  They head into the trees.  They see a good-looking young man eating lunch, but when they head toward him, he runs off.  While tracking him, they suddenly end up in the remains of a large animal, and hear noises from whatever killed it heading their way.  Suddenly, loud thumping music screeches out, and the predator runs off.

The noise came from two more time travellers, who are unsurprised to see the Doctor and Rose.  The two men are dressed like the man they were tracking, are also very good-looking, and both wearing name badges.  Rose realizes that they seem very 'blank' and show very little emotion.

The two men take them Das's squeaky tree, which is a lift that goes to a huge cave containing a wooden city called Osterberg.  As they go to meet Chantal, Rose notices that everyone is movie-premiere attractive, except for one man who looks normal and is dressed very eccentrically with a broad brimmed hat and a cape.

Chantal is very tall, and incredibly beautiful.  She is talking to the man in the hat, who is called Quilley.  He is complaining about the experiment being on day forty-nine when it was only planned for forty.  Chantal recommends he use combo 662 to stop worrying, and Quilley says he doesn't want it.  The Doctor introduces himself and Rose, and while he stays to talk to Chantal, Rose goes with Quilley to talk about 'zoo-tech.'

Chantal has Lene show the Doctor around Osterberg.  The Doctor decides to see if he can break through the universal indifference show by the Osterbergers by asking Lene to pretend that he knows nothing about the city or why they are there.  She looks irritated for a moment, then taps the keypad on her badge and is wildly enthusiastic about explaining it all to him.  She tells him that Chantal is the boss, and came up with the idea of traveling to the past.  Everything that the team does is for her.

The Doctor arrives at Quilley's home, and explains that he's worked it out.  The Osterbergers come from a time after AD 436,000, when a massive space battle caused Earth to be hit with an EMP-like wave, knocking out all electronics and stopping progress in its tracks.  Humanity was forced to focus on non-electronic fields of science, like chemistry and biology. Eventually, the advances in the two fields allowed humans to fully map out the human body. In essence, doctors will act like mechanics - taking people apart and putting them back together with no ill effects.  The Doctor shows Rose one of the badges, and tells her that they use pharmacology to block any 'wrong-feeling.'  Quilley is a Refuser, and won't use the popper packs.

The Doctor asks Quilley to show them the time machine that they came in.  It runs on steam, and the Doctor wants to check it out thoroughly, so he tells Rose she should investigate the creature they encountered earlier.  Quilley tells her that Reddy is going out to visit the Neanderthals, and she could go out with him.  She starts to ask if he will care, then realizes he'll just say 'Yeah, fine, whatever' and not ask any questions.

When they enter the Neanderthal camp, Reddy (who is the first man seen by Rose and the Doctor) is greeted by a female named Ka.  Rose tells them that Das is OK, which they are relieved and happy to know, but that he won't be coming back.  Suddenly, there is a great commotion as a band of human cavemen in skins and blue paint attack the village and takes Rose prisoner.

The Doctor finishes his examination of the engine, and tells Quilley that something is bleeding power off it.  They trace the pipe to the 'Grey Door' and go to see what it is.  It has a huge locking mechanism, and the Doctor starts to open it with his sonic screwdriver.  They hear a voice from the inside, that Quilley identifies as an Osterberger named Tina.  The door opens, and at first there is nothing, then a skeleton wearing Tina's name badge is thrown out.

The Doctor starts to shut the door, but a grey six-fingered had emerges and pushes back.  A tall creature looking vaguely humanoid wearing a suit jumps out and asks if they are human.  The Doctor says of course not, and orders the creature back inside.  He manages to intimidate it and relock the door.  The Doctor tells Quilley that the creature is a product of genetic engineering, created by someone in Osterberg.

As they walk away, they see Chantal approaching with two other Osterbergers.  She tells him the creature is called a Hy-Bractor, and the Doctor calls her its mother.  She is holding a remote control, which she uses to make the two people with her attack the Doctor and Quilley.  They are clubbed unconscious, and the Doctor awakens in Chantal's lab, drugged with a popper pack.

Rose wakes up to see an old woman and her son.  She gives them her name, and tells them she comes from 'nearer the river.'  The woman tells Rose that they have decided she's going to join the family and marry her grandson, which would make her a queen.  Rose tries to tell them that she doesn't want to marry Tillun, but her objections are brushed off.  She finally tells them that she has to go out alone and appease her tribe's god before the wedding, and walks out of camp.

Even though Chantal has given the Doctor twice the normal dosage of chemicals, he manages to fight them off well enough to tie her to a chair and then go to find Quilley.  He rips off his and Quilley's popper packs, and goes to look for an antidote.  While looking in the supply centre, he realizes that the popper pack refills are almost gone.

Chantal is freed by one of the Osterbergers, who she takes to the Grey Door and feeds to the Hy-Bractor.  She then sets all four of them free to eat the rest of the humans, with the exceptions of each other, the Doctor, and herself.

The Doctor hears the screams, and provokes Quilley enough to overcome some of the effect. He tells him to save as many of the Osterbergers as he can.  Then the Doctor goes to warn the Neanderthals and other people on the surface, and to find Rose.  Quilley does his best to motivate the Osterbergers, but is only able to escape with two other people.  They take the lift to the surface while the Hy-Bractors eat everyone else.

Away from the tribe, Rose realizes she has no idea how to find her way back to the Neanderthals.  She has been followed by Tillun, who wants to know why she won't marry him.  As she tries to explain, they hear hoofbeats and hide.  The bushes are parted, and the Doctor is there.  He used the psychic paper (which also does pictures) to tame the horse.

The Doctor tries to tell the Family that they must hide deep in the cave, but they won't believe him because he is a man and an outsider.  Rose asks if they will believe her if she joins the Family, and is told that they will.  So Rose agrees to marry Tillun.  As soon as the ceremony finishes, she orders them to hide.  Tillun tries to make her stay, but the Doctor knocks him down and they leave on the horse.

The Doctor and Rose find the Neanderthal camp site, but there are only four of them left alive - the rest have been killed by the Hy-Bractors.  Chantal walks into the clearing and they are both captured.  The Doctor again awakes in Chantal's lab, where she has also brought the TARDIS.  She tells the Doctor that it won't open for her, and then threatens Rose if he will not help her get inside.  Between the two of them, they manage to capture Chantal and drug her with a double dose from a popper pack.

The Doctor sets to work designing a way to defeat the Hy-Bractors, and runs outside to disperse it into the air.  A Hy-Bractor who was still in Osterberg enters the lab and frees Chantal.  When it tries to eat Rose, she opens her mouth and breathes fire on it (the same thing happening to other Hy-Bractors on the surface).

Chantal makes her way to the time travel machine, where she is found by the Doctor.  He tells her not to enter the beam, but she does and is torn apart by the time winds.  The Doctor realizes that the machine is going to blow up, and he and Rose take the TARDIS to the surface.  They land near Quilley and the other two Osterbergers, but are then discovered by the remaining Hy-Bractor.  The Doctor tells it that Chantal is dead, but that she asked him to tell it to eat anything except humans, and it believes him.

Meanwhile, Jack is helping Das adjust to modern life. By the time the Doctor and Rose return, Das is sufficiently acclimated, has a job, and even finds a girlfriend who suits him. The novel ends with the TARDIS crew jumping forward several weeks to Das's wedding.  Back in prehistoric time, Quilley marries Tillun's grandmother, with the remaining Neanderthals and last Hy-Bractor also living with the family.

Continuity
 The Doctor states he has met Neanderthals before, a reference to the Seventh Doctor serial, Ghost Light which depicted a Neanderthal living in 19th Century England, and possibly a reference to the First Doctor's story An Unearthly Child.
 Jack indicates he has never visited Rose's time, which places this prior to the events of the televised episode "Boom Town". The preceding novel, The Deviant Strain, also take place before "Boom Town", but the following book, The Stealers of Dreams, takes place after the televised episode as it contains a reference to its events.
 Rose finds talking to the prehistoric people very different from those in the more recent past, such as Gwyneth from "The Unquiet Dead", or even aliens on other planets, as it seems that certain concepts are just beyond their understanding.
 The novel makes extensive use of the TARDIS' ability to translate foreign languages into English, as both Neanderthals and cavemen are shown speaking not only literate English, but with 21st-century vernacular as well, although at one point it is revealed that the TARDIS has a "swear filter" (as explained by the Doctor) which substitutes the word "blinking" instead of an obscenity spoken by Nan.
 This book marks the first time that Jack has met Jackie Tyler (albeit briefly). He meets her again in "Journey's End".
There is no Bad Wolf reference in this book.

References to popular culture
 While with the Family, Rose comments that all the furs make it like "Julien Macdonald round here."
  The Doctor says that "Carry On Cleo was more historically accurate than anyone realised."
 The Doctor states that "marrying for love, it's overrated" and to Rose's response of "Like you'd know" says, "Who says I don't?  Ask Lady Mary Wortley Montagu."
 While Chantal is expounding on her theories of evolution, Rose says, "This is turning into Horizon."
 The Doctor calls Tillun Aladdin Sane in reference to the 1973 David Bowie album.  (Bowie on the cover has a stripe of face paint on much like Tillun)
 Quilley has a Coldplay CD among his "ancient artifacts", and it seems the Doctor doesn't think very highly of the band.
 While Jack allows Das to learn about the world by watching television, he feels that Farscape and Deadwood would only confuse a Neanderthal.
 Das mentions his favourite show is Are You Being Served?, although did does not refer to it by name but instead calls the characters the "Grace Brothers". Jack also mentions that he has trouble explaining that 'Mrs Slocombe' is not real to Das.

See also

Whoniverse

References

External links

 The Cloister Library - Only Human

2005 British novels
2005 science fiction novels
Ninth Doctor novels
Novels by Gareth Roberts (writer)
Novels set in London
Prehistoric people in popular culture
Fiction about neanderthals